Farmer Boys may refer to:

In food:
Farmer Boys (fast casual chain), an American fast casual restaurant chain

In music:

Farmer Boys (band), a German metal band
The Farmer's Boys, a British band